Mondragon University (MU) is a non-profit cooperative private university in the Basque Country, officially established and recognised in 1997. It is part of the Mondragon Corporation. Its main campus is in Mondragón, Gipuzkoa.

History 
The institution first originated as the Escuela Politécnica Superior, a polytechnic school established by José María Arizmendiarrieta in 1943 that was open to young people in the region.

The current university was formed in 1997 through the association of three existing educational cooperatives tied to the Mondragon Corporation: Mondragon Goi Eskola Politeknikoa “Jose Mª Arizmendiarrieta” S. Coop., ETEO S. Coop., and Irakasle Eskola S. Coop. Before 1997, these three educational cooperatives were affiliated with the University of the Basque Country. The new entity was set up as a non-profit cooperative university, an unprecedented organizational structure in the Spanish landscape of private universities at the time, with the aim of creating a university "close to the needs of businesses". The new university was officially recognized by the Basque Parliament on 30 May 1997.

Notes and references

External links 
 Mondragon University

1997 establishments in Spain
Buildings and structures in Gipuzkoa
Education in the Basque Country (autonomous community)
Educational institutions established in 1997
Mondragon Corporation
Mondragon University
Private universities and colleges in Spain